Hunter is the name of two DC Comics supervillains who appear in stories of the Legion of Super-Heroes. They are not to be confused with Rip Hunter.

Fictional character biographies

Otto Orion
The first Hunter first appeared in Adventure Comics #358 (July 1967). Otto Orion is a master hunter on the planet Simballi where he became its sole ruler. Hoping to find new prey to hunt, he hunts the Legion of Super-Heroes, during which battle he is killed.

Adam Orion
The second Hunter first appeared in Superboy (1st series) #199 (November 1973). Adam Orion is the son of Otto Orion. He blamed the Legion for his father's death and tried to get revenge on them, but was thwarted by Bouncing Boy. Some years later, he joined the extended Legion of Super-Villains gathered by Nemesis Kid on the planet Orando.

In Final Crisis, he was among the supervillains in Superman-Prime's Legion of Super-Villains.

Powers and abilities
Neither version of Hunter had any actual powers, but they were both master hunters and trackers.

In other media
The Adam Orion version of Hunter appeared in an episode of Legion of Super Heroes, voiced by Khary Payton in a thick Australian accent. He is seen as a member of the Legion of Super-Villains.

External links
http://www.dcuguide.com/who.php?name=hunter2: Otto Orion's page on dcuguide.com
http://www.dcuguide.com/who.php?name=hunter3: Adam Orion's page on dcuguide.com

DC Comics supervillains
Fictional hunters in comics